Lichenopteryx is a genus of moths in the family Eupterotidae.

Species
 Lichenopteryx despecta Felder, 1874
 Lichenopteryx scotina Hering, 1932

References

Eupterotinae
Moth genera